Wągrowiec Abbey is a former Cistercian abbey in Wągrowiec, Poland. The former monastery's church is named in honor of the Assumption of Mary and serves as a parish church. The other buildings of the former monastic complex either serve the parish or are part of the local regional museum.

Gallery

See also 
 List of Cistercian monasteries

References 

Baroque church buildings in Poland
Churches in Greater Poland Voivodeship
Cistercian monasteries in Poland
Wągrowiec County